Football is the most popular sport in Brazil and a prominent part of the country’s national identity. The Brazil national football team has won the FIFA World Cup five times, the most of any team, in 1958, 1962, 1970, 1994 and 2002. Brazil and Germany are the only teams to succeed in qualifying for all the World Cups for which they entered the qualifiers; Brazil is the only team to participate in every World Cup competition ever held. Brazil has also won an Olympic gold medal, at the 2016 Summer Olympics held in Rio de Janeiro and at the 2020 Summer Olympics in Tokyo.

Pelé won three World Cups (he was injured during most of the 1962 World Cup). Some of the most prominent players in football come from Brazil, including Garrincha, Cafu, Roberto Carlos, Romário, Rivaldo, Ronaldo Nazário, Ronaldinho, Kaká,  Neymar, Falcão (futsal player) in men's game and Marta in the women's game.

The governing body of football in Brazil is the Brazilian Football Confederation.

History
Football was introduced to Brazil by Scottish immigrant Thomas Donohoe. The first football match played in Brazil was in April 1894, played on a pitch marked out by Donohoe next to his workplace in Bangu.

In the 1870s, like many other British workers, a Scottish expatriate named John Miller worked on the railroad construction project in São Paulo with other European immigrants. In 1884, Miller sent his ten-year-old son Charles William Miller to Bannister School in Southampton, England, to be educated. Charles was a skilled athlete who quickly picked up the game of football at the time when the Football League was still being formed, and as an accomplished winger and striker Charles held school honors that gained him entry into the Southampton F.C. team, and later into the county team of Hampshire.

In 1888, the first sports club was founded in the city, São Paulo Athletic Club. In 1892, while still in England, Charles was invited to play a game for Corinthian F.C., a team formed of players invited from public schools and universities. On his return to Brazil, Charles brought some football equipment and a rule book with him. He then taught the rules of the game to players in São Paulo. On December 14, 1901, the "Liga Paulista de Foot-Ball" was founded, organising its own championship, "Campeonato Paulista", first held in 1902. Therefore Campeonato Paulista became the oldest official competition in Brazilian football.

São Paulo Athletic Club won the first three years' Paulista championships. Miller's skills were far above his colleagues at this stage. He was given the honor of contributing his name to a move involving a deft flick of the ball with the heel "Chaleira" (the "tea-pot"). The first match played by one of Miller's teams was six months after Donohoe's.

Another competition, Campeonato Carioca, was first held in 1906 as the Rio de Janeiro State football championship, being contested up to present days.

Charles Miller kept a strong bond with English football throughout his life. After a tour of English team Corinthian F.C. to Brazil in 1910, Corinthians was established on September 1, taking on the name of the British side after a suggestion from Miller. In 1913 there were two different editions of the Campeonato Paulista. One was organized by the Associação Paulista de Esportes Atléticos (APEA) while the other one was organized by the Liga Paulista de Foot-Ball (LPF).

The Brazilian Football Confederation (CBF) was founded in 1914, but the current format for the Campeonato Brasileiro was only established in 1959.

From August 1941 through April 11, 1983, women's football was prohibited in Brazil. The law, created by the Conselho Nacional de Desportos, determined that "violent" sports such as football, rugby, and boxing were incompatible with women's capabilities. Despite the ban, women's teams continued to play informally for the next four decades, gaining increasing popular support through the 1970s and early 1980s. The movement to legalize women's football, which coincided with the feminist movement in Brazil at the time, contributed to the termination of the ban by the CND, which also cited rules set by the Union of European Football Associations in its decision.

On September 29, 2007, it was announced that the CBF would launch a Women's Association Football league and cup competition in October 2007 following pressure from FIFA president Sepp Blatter during the 2007 FIFA Women's World Cup in China.

In 2013, a year before the 2014 World Cup, hosted at home, Brazil's FIFA World Rank dropped to 22nd, an all-time-low position. During that tournament, Brazil made it to the semi-finals but were eliminated by Germany in a heavy 7–1 loss.

In 2014, Brazil was one of the eight nations to take part in the first Unity World Cup. The team played the opening game with notable players such as Beto, Fabio Luciano and Carlos Luciano da Silva.

During the pandemic COVID-19, Brazil was one of the first countries to return to football activities in Latin America. Important to analyze a research published about the topic exploring the Serie A. The COVID-19 pandemic directly reached and impacted upon elite sports and caused the postponement of sporting events globally. In order to enable the return of activities, protocols were created with recommendations to prevent the transmission of COVID-19. The research analyzes and compares the safe return protocols of major football leagues and associations to those of the Brazilian Championship, as well as to survey the numbers of COVID-19 outbreaks in clubs that competed in the 2020 Brazilian Championship Series A.

Football culture

Football is a significant part of the Brazilian identity. It is considered the country’s most significant socio-cultural activity. In this way, football is not only a sport, but also an essential part of Brazil’s cultural identity. It is the most popular sport in Brazil, and Brazilians passion for the sport makes them often refer to their country as "o País do Futebol" ("the country of football").

Nevertheless, this was not always the case. Initially, when the English introduced football in Brazil, it was an elitist and racist sport. Most of Brazilian population was excluded from it, as it was a white, aristocratic sport, and most of the Brazilian population was mixed-race, illiterate, and low-income. As a result, the first established soccer clubs in Brazil had racial and income restrictions.

This social and racial exclusion was a reflect of the biases of Brazilian society at the time. The sport started gaining popularity in the country a few years after the abolishment of slavery. In this period, discrimination and hierarchical structural marked the Brazil’s social structure, and prevented the integration of minorities into football.  

Nevertheless, even with the social and political barriers against racial and class inclusion in football, marginalized individuals started to enter the sport. These people fought the rigid discriminatory structures that were held in place and helped expand the sport beyond the aristocrat sectors of society. That lead to the increased popularization and democratization of football in the country.

The integration of the sport in different segments of society marked the beginning of the Brazilian football identity. The sport became part of Brazilians daily life, and with time, it also became part of the popular culture. As the sport dominated the country, football clubs were increasingly pressured to include in their teams black and underprivileged players. That integration resulted in the transformation of the sport in the country, by changing the way players play and the way people interacted with football. The game that was initially restricted to the privileged elite was taken over by the masses and that altered the way people played, and fans interacted with the clubs.

In this way, football served as an instrument of social and cultural change that helped partially overcome the exclusion and stigmatization that marked Brazilian society. That transformed the traditional gentlemanly form of the sport to the spontaneous one we recognize nowadays.

The populist spirit of Brazilian football challenged the outdated socials norms that were held in place. As the sport became increasingly popular around the country, its spirit was incorporated into Brazilian identity and challenged the political dominance of that time.

The biggest evidence of the importance that football has on Brazilian culture is the World Cup. Every four years, Brazilians dominate the streets, cheering and celebrating their country. The sport brings people together and promote a collective identity. In a society that is still extremely segregated by race and class, these moments of collective union are essential to the formation and maintenance of a national identity.

Nowadays, it is indisputable the major effect football has on Brazilian culture. It is the favorite pastime of youngsters and adults who frequently watch and play the sport. The influence of the sport is so significant that critics argue that political parties try to take advantage of the nationalistic surge created by football and bring it into politics.

Football style
Brazil plays a very unfundamental and distinctive style. For example, dribbling is an essential part of their style. Many people criticized former head coach Dunga because of the pragmatist, fundamental, defensive-minded style he brought to Brazil. After Brazil's failure at the 2010 FIFA World Cup, Dunga was fired and Mano Menezes became the head coach. With the aid of young talents such as Neymar, Lucas Moura, Paulo Henrique Ganso, Oscar and more, Brazil strives to return to its creative style.

The great exodus of players in recent years to European competitions is scene of much debate in the country, especially about the consequences that this would generate in the style of Brazilian football.

Race and football

Historical background 

Race appears as a prominent issue in discussing football in Brazil. Individual's socioeconomic status, ethnic identities, and family backgrounds—key components that closely tied with race in Brazil—were heavily involved throughout the development of the sport. Gregg Bocketti, a professor of history at Transylvania University, presents how football incorporated participant's racial identities during the process of expanding the sport across the country in his book—The Invention of The Beautiful Game: Football and the Making of Modern Brazil. According to the author, Football was first introduced in Brazil as a European sport that exclusively favored white males with social and economic privileges. Charles Miller, a Brazilian-born male of Scottish descent who learned to play the sport while attending boarding school in Southampton, championed this persistent hierarchy within the sport, and further promoted his idea through recruiting members of the British expatriate São Paulo Athletic Club and his Brazilian acquaintances to take charge of the game. Moreover, Miller's vision perceived football as an effective tool to "improve Brazil according to a European standard…and was infused by Eurocentrism and social exclusivity." Above all, football functioned as an integral component in the "high life among the urban upper classes" during the late nineteenth century Brazil.

Throughout the early twentieth century, racial exclusivity continued to exist yet with major changes in the sport's perception on racial minorities. Under the Vargas regime, football expanded its scope of participants. During the 1930s, Getúlio Vargas, former President of Brazil, issued policies that promoted nationalism across the nation in which football served as an effective tool in unifying the people of Brazil as a single race. This allowed the Brazil national team to compete in international games overseas during which the administrators believed the team should be "represented by its best players, regardless of their backgrounds." Many non-white soccer players from the working class demonstrated their skills and talents at publicly recognized games. Mario Filho, a writer for the Journal dos Sports in 1936, commented that "in football there was not even the merest shadow of racism." In contrast, Bocketti argues Filho's statement lacked in understanding "the reality that traditional hierarchies and traditional exclusions" were deeply embedded throughout the 1930s. This was true because football clubs in Brazil were still organized and managed by privileged white administrators with wealthy backgrounds who established football amateurism to increase exclusivity among participants during the 1930s and 1940s.

Racial discrimination 

Although non-white footballers had the opportunity to participate in a higher level of football, racial discrimination remains a serious problem in the Brazilian football communities. Before football in Brazil became a nationalized and popularized sport with participants from various racial, ethnic, and social backgrounds, the sport "advertised Brazil as white and cosmopolitan," which important political figures considered individual's race, class, and region in building representative sides. In relation to racial hierarchy, Bocketti argues that the Europeans perceived non-white soccer players as inferior and considered racial minorities’ participation in football as physical labor and exclusive for lower class. In the early twentieth century, prestigious football clubs in Rio de Janeiro prohibited non-white players to compete in the league tournaments. This trivialization continues throughout modern day society in which non-white soccer players are portrayed as inherently inferior. For example, various media reports reveal that non-white Brazilian soccer participants still experience racial discrimination. Neymar Junior, in his interview, shared his confrontations with coaches and fans for calling him a monkey. Similarly, non-white soccer players are often referred as a monkey to degrade their identities based on their race. Moreover, Aranha, a goalkeeper for the Paulista club, was targeted for racist abuse from the audiences, and so was Dida, a former goalkeeper for the Brazil national team, and Marcio Chagas da Silva.  In 2014, twelve incidents of racial discrimination were reported from soccer matches in Brazil.

Racial mobilization 

For non-white football players, their social privilege and acknowledgement acquired through football allowed them to practice racial mobility despite their original heritage.  In the 1930s, nationalization of football allowed non-white football players to experience social mobilization. However, professionalization of football in the early twentieth century Brazil strictly prioritized individuals with affluent backgrounds. Thus, non-white football players, after ascending their socioeconomic status, were accustomed to an exclusive environment in which the members were politically, socially, and economically influential. For instance, Arthur Friedenreich, a Brazilian football player with African and European heritage, experienced the upward social mobility during the 1910s through demonstrating his skills in football. However, he did not categorize himself as non-white but rather preferred to be identified as white because it was the color that was "traditionally accepted by Brazilian elites." Moreover, worldly renown football stars in the contemporary society such as Roberto Carlos, Ronaldo, and Neymar Jr. refused to be racially identified as black but rather as white. It is impossible to trace and beg the question of these players’ true intentions. Unlike the issues non-whites soccer players face for their statements, Kaka, a white Brazilian football star, is portrayed as a sincere Christian and devoted father with no internal or external conflicts regarding his race. In contrast, those who characterizes their race differently are depicted as a betrayer and unfaithful person. According to The Times of India, anthropologists and sociologists conducted research to demonstrate that racial minorities in Brazil tend to undergo upward mobilization to segregate themselves from underprivileged and underdeveloped environment. Football stars, in this context, showed similar process which they prefer to be identified as powerful figures through categorizing themselves as white. For example, in writing about Arthur Friedenreich, Mário Filho wrote that "the black man in Brazil does not want to be black," and therefore many Brazilians "did not believe black men should represent the nation."

Brazilian football in television
Football is broadcast in television in the following channels:

Free television
 Rede Globo — Campeonato Brasileiro Série A, Campeonato Brasileiro Série B, Copa do Brasil, Supercopa do Brasil, Copa São Paulo de Futebol Júnior, Copa América, FIFA World Cup, FIFA Women's World Cup, FIFA Club World Cup, UEFA Euro, FIFA World Cup qualification (CONMEBOL), Campeonato Paulista, Campeonato Mineiro, Campeonato Gaúcho, Campeonato Catarinense, Campeonato Pernambucano, Campeonato Goiano, Campeonato Mato-Grossense.
 SBT — Copa Libertadores, Copa do Nordeste, Campeonato Paranaense, Campeonato Piauiense, UEFA Champions League .
 RecordTV / Record News — Campeonato Carioca, Campeonato Sergipano.
 Band — Campeonato Brasileiro Série C, Campeonato Brasileiro Feminino, Campeonato Brasileiro U-20, Copa do Brasil U-20, Serie A, Bundesliga, DFL-Supercup, Russian Premier League, Campeonato Alagoano, Campeonato Potiguar.
 TV Cultura — Copa Verde, Campeonato Paraense.
 TV Brasil — Campeonato Brasileiro Série D, Copa Verde.
 TVE Bahia — Campeonato Baiano.
 Facebook Watch (Streaming) — Copa Libertadores, UEFA Champions League, UEFA Super Cup.
 YouTube (Streaming) — UEFA Nations League, Copa do Nordeste, Campeonato Carioca, Campeonato Baiano.
 OneFootball (Streaming) — Bundesliga, 2. Bundesliga, Ligue 1, Austrian Bundesliga, UEFA Champions League qualifying, UEFA Europa League qualifying.

Paid television
 SporTV — Campeonato Brasileiro Série A, Campeonato Brasileiro Série B, Campeonato Brasileiro U-20, Copa do Brasil, Copa do Brasil U-20, Copa do Brasil U-17, Supercopa do Brasil, Florida Cup, Copa São Paulo de Futebol Júnior, Taça BH, Serie A, Taça de Portugal, Copa América, U-20 South American Championship, FIFA World Cup, FIFA Women's World Cup, FIFA U-20 World Cup, FIFA U-17 World Cup, FIFA U-20 Women's World Cup, FIFA U-17 Women's World Cup, FIFA Club World Cup, UEFA Euro, FIFA World Cup qualification (CONMEBOL), Campeonato Paulista, Campeonato Paulista Série A2, Campeonato Paulista de Futebol Feminino, Campeonato Mineiro, Campeonato Gaúcho, Campeonato Pernambucano.
 ESPN / ESPN Brasil — Campeonato Brasileiro Feminino, UEFA Europa League, UEFA Women's Champions League, La Liga, Copa del Rey, Supercopa de España, Copa de la Reina, Supercopa de España Femenina, Premier League,  EFL Championship, EFL Cup, Women's FA Community Shield, DFB-Pokal, Eredivisie, Primeira Liga, Chinese Super League, J.League Cup / Copa Sudamericana Championship, Major League Soccer, U.S. Open Cup, Audi Cup, Joan Gamper Trophy, UEFA Champions League qualifying.
 Fox Sports Brasil – UEFA Europa League, Copa Libertadores, Coupe de France, Copa do Nordeste, Premier League, EFL Championship, La Liga, DFB-Pokal, Primeira Liga, Eredivisie, Chinese Super League.
 TNT Sports (TNT / Space) — Campeonato Brasileiro Série A, UEFA Champions League, Serie A, UEFA Nations League, UEFA Euro qualifying.
 BandSports — Serie A, Russian Premier League, FIFA World Cup qualification (CONMEBOL), Copa Paulista.
 Premiere (Pay-per-view) — Campeonato Brasileiro Série A, Campeonato Brasileiro Série B, Copa do Brasil, Campeonato Paulista, Campeonato Mineiro, Campeonato Gaúcho, Campeonato Pernambucano.
 Conmebol TV (Pay-per-view) — Copa Libertadores, Copa Sudamericana, Recopa Sudamericana.
 FERJ TV (Pay-per-view) — Campeonato Carioca.
 Copa do Nordeste (Pay-per-view) — Copa do Nordeste.
 DAZN (Streaming) — Campeonato Brasileiro Série C, Premier League, FA Cup, FA Community Shield, Coppa Italia, Supercoppa Italiana, Süper Lig, Major League Soccer, Liga MX, Africa Cup of Nations, CONCACAF Gold Cup.
 Estádio TNT Sports (Streaming) — Campeonato Brasileiro Série A, UEFA Champions League, Serie A, UEFA Nations League, FIFA World Cup qualification (UEFA), FIFA World Cup qualification (CONMEBOL), UEFA Euro qualifying.
 PlayPlus / R7.com (Streaming) — Campeonato Carioca.
 Nordeste FC (Streaming) — Copa do Nordeste, Campeonato Cearense.
 Paulistão Play (Streaming) — Copa São Paulo de Futebol Júnior, Campeonato Paulista Série A2, Campeonato Paulista Série A3, Campeonato Paulista Segunda Divisão, Campeonato Paulista de Futebol Feminino, Copa Paulista
 TV Walter Abrahão — Campeonato Catarinense.

League system
Brazilian football clubs are affiliate to their state federations and state federations are themselves federate to Brazilian Football Confederation.
As such, each state has its own league pyramid (see State Championships), Campeonato Paulista (the oldest and most traditional), Campeonato Carioca, Campeonato Mineiro, Campeonato Gaúcho being the most prominent.

There's a parallel federal pyramid. That means each club plays its state championships and only some biggest clubs play on the federal championships. Those two systems run in parallel there's no direct rank or relegation-promotion from one to the other besides state federations being responsible for appointing one to four clubs each to form each year Campeonato Brasileiro Série D. Each state set its own rule for those appointments but it's usually done through best position of the clubs on the top state tier that does not play any federal league or by a qualifying tournament, e.g. Copa Paulista is a tournament to select the fourth qualified from São Paulo (state) to Série D.

The federal system is composed of four tiers:
 Campeonato Brasileiro Série A - 20 clubs (relegates 4 to Série B)
 Campeonato Brasileiro Série B - 20 clubs (relegates 4 to Série C, promotes 4 to Série A)
 Campeonato Brasileiro Série C - 20 clubs (relegates 4 to Série D, promotes 4 to Série B)
 Campeonato Brasileiro Série D - 68 clubs (promotes 4 to Série C, other 64 demised). Despite the 4 relegated from last year Série C, all other 64 spots are designated by state federations by their own criteria.
State top tiers run from January to April and federal leagues from May to December, so clubs on federal leagues can handle their state schedule without conflict. Lower state tiers run from February to November.

Although uncommon it's possible for a 'big' club to be relegated to its state second tier league while still playing a federal league. It happened for instance to Criciúma who was relegated to 2022 Campeonato Catarinense Série B, the second tier league on Santa Catarina pyramid, while still playing Campeonato Brasileiro Série B. They resolved the problem of schedule conflict fielding a junior team in 2022 Campeonasto Catarinense Série B. Many of the states championships have their own promotion/relegation system.

Largest Brazilian football stadiums

See also
 Archie McLean
 Charles William Miller
 List of football clubs in Brazil

References